Le Jeu de la Hache ("The Play of the Axe") is a French manual on combat with the poleaxe dating to c. 1400.

The manuscript measures   and consists of ten vellum leaves. The text consists of a  prologue (fols. 2r-v, paragraphs 1-4), a main section (paragraphs 4-51) describing combat between two right-handed opponents, followed by a shorter part (paragraphs 52-73) discussing how a right-handed knight should deal with a left-handed opponent.

The manuscript is recorded to have been part of the library of Francis I in 1544 as it was moved to Fontainebleau.

Literature
Anglo, Sydney. "Le Jeu de la Hache. A Fifteenth-Century Treatise on the Teaching of Chivalric Axe Combat" Archaeologia 109 (1991) 113-28

See also
Fechtbuch
Fiore dei Liberi

External links
https://web.archive.org/web/20061203062729/http://jfgilles.club.fr/escrime/bibliotheque/jeu_de_la_hache/index.html
http://www.thearma.org/spotlight/lejeudelahache.htm
http://www.thearma.org/spotlight/NotesLEJEUDELAHACHE.htm

Combat treatises